Roberto González López (17 September 1978 – 29 December 2019) artistically known as Sebastián Ferrat, was a Mexican television actor, and stage actor.

Life
Ferrat was born in Mexicali, Baja California, Mexico. He studied acting and dramaturgy at the Televisa Centro de Educación Artística from which he left in 2005.

He is best known for his roles in various telenovelas for Televisión Azteca and Telemundo. Ferrat became known mostly for his character Juan Antonio Marcado in the third and fourth season of the Telemundo crime drama series El Señor de los Cielos (2015–2016). 

In October 2019 it was confirmed that Ferrat acquired an illness called Cysticercosis from eating contaminated food with tapeworm eggs which are usually found in feces of tapeworm carriers. Ferrat died two months later on 29 December as a result of the illness.

Filmography

Stage roles

Television roles

References

External links 

 

1978 births
2019 deaths
People educated at Centro de Estudios y Formación Actoral
21st-century Mexican male actors
Mexican male telenovela actors
Place of death missing
Mexican male television actors
People from Mexicali
Deaths from food poisoning